Roy Chester Moody (March 2, 1935 – September 21, 2013) played in the Negro leagues during their dying days. He played for the New York Black Yankees in 1956 and for the Indianapolis Clowns at one point.

References

1935 births
2013 deaths
New York Black Yankees players
Indianapolis Clowns players
20th-century African-American sportspeople
21st-century African-American people